Lego Star Wars: The Freemaker Adventures is a 3D CGI animated television series that is based on the Lego Star Wars theme, and premiered on Disney XD on June 20, 2016. Disney XD announced that it had renewed the series for a second season on April 3, 2017. A new series of five shorts debuted on May 4, with the second season premiering airing on June 17, 2017; the series' final episode aired on August 16, 2017. A follow-up series, Lego Star Wars: All-Stars, aired in 2018.

Overview
Set between Star Wars: Episode V – The Empire Strikes Back and Star Wars: Episode VI – Return of the Jedi, The Freemaker Adventures centers on a family of three siblings — Rowan, Kordi, and Zander Freemaker — and their ex-battle droid companion R0-GR, who salvage parts from destroyed or damaged ships in order to build new ones, which they sell from their workshop aboard a space station known as the Wheel.

During the first season, the Freemakers inadvertently become caught in the conflict between Galactic Empire and the Rebel Alliance when Rowan discovers his connection to the Force and part of an ancient artifact known as the Kyber Saber. Aided by a Force-wielder named Naare, the Freemakers embark on a journey to uncover the mystery of the Kyber Saber, which leads them to meet new and old Lego faces from the Star Wars universe. In the second season, the Freemakers join the Rebel Alliance and attempt to build the Arrowhead, a kyber crystal-powered ship which Rowan saw in a vision and is supposedly the key to defeating the Empire. During this time, they are pursued by MO-C, a droid built by the Emperor for the sole purpose of capturing Rowan, and Darth Vader, who is also looking for kyber crystals to power the Empire's new battle station: the Death Star II.

Cast and characters

Main

 Nicolas Cantu as Rowan Freemaker, the young 12-year-old Force-sensitive member of the family who often has trouble with paying attention to his older siblings and other authority figures. Once trained in the use of the Force, he begins to use it constructively, thus becoming a successor of an ancient group of Jedi known as Force-Builders. His special sensitivity to kyber crystals make him a target for several nefarious adversaries throughout the series, including Emperor Palpatine and Graballa the Hutt.
 Vanessa Lengies as Kordi Freemaker, the responsible, money-conscious middle sibling of the family who is fiercely protective of her younger brother Rowan and disapproves of his involvement in the quest for the Kyber Saber.
 Eugene Byrd as Zander Freemaker, the eldest son of the family and a mechanic who specializes in creating new ships and devices from leftover components. He hates his creations being called "Uglies", preferring the term "Z-Wings", and has a weakness for pretty ladies, including Naare (until learning that she is working for the Empire), Rebel pilot Lt. Valeria, and Becky Smoochenbacher (voiced by Dove Cameron), a resident of the Wheel.
 Matthew Wood as R0-GR (pronounced Roger), a battle droid and veteran of the Clone Wars who was salvaged by the Freemakers and reprogrammed to be their servant and friend.

Recurring

The Empire
 Grey Griffin as Naare, a dark side user and self-proclaimed Sith in the service of Emperor Palpatine who is masquerading as a Jedi survivor of Order 66 to fool and use the Freemakers in her mission to find the Kyber Saber crystals. She has a set of facial markings that change shape and color along with her eyes when she becomes angry or taps into the dark side.
 Matt Sloan as Darth Vader, a Sith Lord, Emperor Palpatine's apprentice and chief enforcer, and the most feared man in the galaxy.
 Trevor Devall as Emperor Palpatine, the ruler of the Empire and Darth Vader's Sith master.
 Richard Kind as Durpin, a cowardly Imperial officer who is introduced as a lieutenant commander but soon promoted to general by the Emperor. Durpin is fully aware of the perils of high rank in the Empire and seeks to avoid it at all cost. After each failure to capture the Freemakers, he is relocated to another Empire-controlled planet which happens to be visited by the Freemakers in short order, causing him yet another humiliating defeat.
 Jeff Bennett as Plumestriker, Durpin's second-in-command who lacks his superior's healthy fear of the perils of being in a command position in the Empire and is eager for Durpin to climb the Imperial ladder. In the second season he becomes more independent-minded and more willing to capture the Freemakers than Durpin in order to finally escape his continual penalty assignments.
 Jane Leeves as Lieutenant Estoc, an Imperial officer assigned to the Wheel who participates in the hunt for Luke and Leia when they arrive at the station looking for repairs.

Hutts
 Dana Snyder as Graballa the Hutt, a Hutt crime lord and Jabba's envious cousin who is constantly kept from pursuing his own ambitions by Jabba's greater influence and who seeks the kyber crystals as a means of gaining power. He is 462 years old, and has spent 200 of them running a mining operation in an asteroid field, nursing his dreams of running a beach resort. He eventually joins forces with Naare so that the pair can recover the crystals together until she betrays Graballa. In the second season, he is drafted by Darth Vader to locate more kyber crystals to complete the second Death Star.
 Kevin Michael Richardson as Jabba the Hutt, the biggest Hutt crime lord in the galaxy and Graballa's cousin who is often annoyed by his antics. Unlike Graballa, who speaks in Galactic Basic (English), Jabba speaks in Huttese.

Bounty Hunters
 James Patrick Stuart as Dengar, a bounty hunter in Graballa's employ who is best known for not being as feared as Boba Fett. In this series, his trademark head wrappings occasionally serve him as an improvised utility tool (parachute, rappelling rope, etc.).
 John DiMaggio and Danny Jacobs as Baash and Raam, a pair of idiotic Iktotchi in the employ of Graballa the Hutt who are constant thorns in his and Dengar's side due to their incompetence.
 Dee Bradley Baker as Boba Fett, a notorious bounty hunter wearing Mandalorian armor in the employ of Jabba the Hutt who is old friends with Dengar. Baker also provides various additional voices such as Ben Quadinaros, and is known for voicing all the clone troopers in Star Wars: The Clone Wars and Star Wars Rebels among other roles.

Rebel Alliance
 Billy Dee Williams as Lando Calrissian, the former Administrator of Cloud City turned general in the Rebel Alliance. He works with Chewbacca in the absence of Han Solo.
 Eric Bauza as Luke Skywalker, an X-wing pilot in the Rebel Alliance and Jedi-in-training. As The Freemaker Adventures takes place after The Empire Strikes Back, Luke appears in his attire from Return of the Jedi and wields his green lightsaber.
 Julie Dolan as Princess Leia Organa, the princess of the now-destroyed planet of Alderaan and a leader in the Rebel Alliance.
 Trevor Devall as Admiral Ackbar, the Mon Calamari fleet admiral of  the Rebel Alliance.
 Yvette Nicole Brown as Lt. Valeria, a fighter pilot for the Rebel Alliance. (season 2)
 Vanessa Marshall as Hera Syndulla, a Twi'Lek pilot and general in the Rebel Alliance. Her droid Chopper also appears. (season 2)
 Corey Burton as Quarrie, an elderly Mon Calamari and an experienced ship builder and mechanic, responsible for the creation of the B-Wing in Star Wars: Rebels, who becomes Rowan's mentor. (season 2)

Force-users
 Brian Dobson as Jek-14, also known as the Maker of Zoh, a former Sith experiment who now tries to avoid any form of conflict and uses the Force to build. Jek first appeared in Lego Star Wars: The Yoda Chronicles and its sequel series Lego Star Wars: The New Yoda Chronicles, and in The Freemaker Adventures is seen in his elderly appearance from the latter.
 Trevor Devall as Baird Kantoo, a Jedi Knight who created the Kyber Saber. After discovering how destructive the Kyber Saber is, he smashed it and gave each piece to trusted Jedi Knights to hide them in different areas around the galaxy to keep it out of evil's hand.

Droids
 French Stewart as N3-R0, a droid who hates humans due to their mistreatment of droids.
 Fred Tatasciore as BL-OX, a large droid loyal to Jek but influenced by N3-R0.
 James Urbaniak as M-OC, an Imperial hunting droid, who is assigned by Palpatine to hunt down Rowan Freemaker. He sports a versatile arsenal wielded by hand or installed into his body, including a pair of red lightsabers. M-OC and Darth Vader quickly become bitter rivals for the Emperor's favor as they repeatedly let the Freemakers slip through their grasp. (season 2)

Civilians
 Thomas Lennon as Wick Cooper, a wealthy resident of the Wheel space station who occasionally comes to the Freemakers to have them work on his vehicles. Very full of himself and proud of his station, he is quite willing to bully the Freemakers (particularly Zander) and others whom he regards as beneath him. He is also an insensitive individual, once making a joke at the expense of the destroyed planet Alderaan - in the presence of Princess Leia. He is also the Emperor's self-proclaimed biggest fan. After the Freemakers are forced to leave their shop, he turns it into an expensive but lucrative café.
 Jeff Bennett as Ignacio Wortan, a Twi'lek businessman.
 Greg Baldwin as Furlac, the Freemakers' merciless Aqualish landlord aboard the Wheel space station. He is constantly threatening to throw the Freemakers out if they don't pay rent on their shop in time, but notably is susceptible to Force persuasion as employed by Naare. In the second season, he becomes an ally to Graballa.
 Jim Cummings as Hondo Ohnaka, a notorious Weequay pirate who led the Ohnaka Gang during the Clone Wars.
 Grey Griffin as Maz Kanata, an ex-pirate and -smuggler and current bar owner on Takodana.

Episodes

Series overview

Season 1 (2016)

Season 2 (2017)

Shorts (2017)
To celebrate "Star Wars Day", and in advance of the premiere of season 2 in summer 2017, Disney XD aired five Lego Star Wars: The Freemaker Adventures shorts on May 4, 2017, as well as releasing the shorts on the Disney XD website, the Disney XD app, and Disney XD's official YouTube account. The later second-season premiere episode, "A New Home", is composed of the scenes from the shorts.

Release
The first season of Lego Star Wars: The Freemaker Adventures premiered on Disney XD on June 20, 2016. DVD release also includes 'The Freemaker Adventures: Meet the Freemaker Family', 'Freemaker Salvage and Repair', 6 exclusive magnets featuring images from the series.

The first episode of the second season premiered in the form of five shorts on May 4, 2017. The second season was released on Disney XD on June 17, 2017. Season two DVD (released on March 13, 2018) also includes the 2017 shorts, Lego Darth Vader Enamel Pin.

The series is available on the Disney+ streaming service.

Lego Star Wars: All Stars
A follow-up television series, Lego Star Wars: All Stars, debuted November 10, 2018. While the Freemakers appear in supporting roles, All-Stars primarily follows other members of their family, including their parents Pace and Lena during Solo: A Star Wars Story, Zander's daughter Moxie during the sequel trilogy, and R0-GR across the entire Star Wars saga.

References

External links

2010s American animated television series
2010s American comic science fiction television series
2016 American television series debuts
2017 American television series endings
American children's animated action television series
American children's animated space adventure television series
American children's animated comic science fiction television series
American computer-animated television series
Disney XD original programming
English-language television shows
Interquel television series
Television series by Lucasfilm
Freemaker Adventures
Star Wars animated television series
Star Wars: The Freemaker Adventures
Star Wars: The Freemaker Adventures
Animated television shows based on films